Kovelamudi or Kovelamoodi (Telugu: కోవెలమూడి) is a village in Guntur district, Andhra Pradesh.

Kovelamudi or Kovelamoodi is one of the Indian surnames.
 Kovelamudi Surya Prakash Rao, a versatile Indian actor, cinematographer, director and producer.
 Kovelamudi Raghavendra Rao, a veteran Indian film director.
 Kovelamudi Prakash, an Indian film director.
 Kovelamudi Bapayya, an Indian film director

Indian surnames